Marieke Anouk Dekker (born 15 November 1986) is a Dutch footballer who plays for Braga. She is a member of the Netherlands national team.

Club career

She played for FFC Heike Rheine in the Frauen-Bundesliga from 2005 to 2007 before moving to Dutch club FC Twente, which played in the Eredivisie and later the BeNe League, in 2007. After almost nine seasons with FC Twente, she moved to the Division 1 Féminine side Montpellier HSC in January 2016. She played in France for  years before moving to Portugal to play for SC Braga in the summer of 2021.

International career
On 21 November 2009, Netherlands national team coach Vera Pauw awarded Dekker her first senior cap, versus Belarus.

She was called up to be part of the national team squad for UEFA Women's Euro 2013 in Sweden. Despite suffering a facial injury in the last warm-up friendly, a 3–0 win over Northern Ireland, Dekker retained her place in the squad.

Dekker was also part of the Dutch teams of the 2015 FIFA Women's World Cup and the winning team of the UEFA Women's Euro 2017, she played all matches in both tournaments and was named in the 2017 UEFA Team of the Tournament.

Dekker was selected in the final squad for the 2019 FIFA Women's World Cup in France. She scored in the last group game helping to secure a 2–1 win against Canada. The win left Netherlands top of group E.

International goals
Scores and results list the Netherlands goal tally first.

Personal life
Dekker has a twin brother, Xander.

Honours

Club
Twente
 BeNe League: 2012–13, 2013–14
 Eredivisie: 2010–11, 2012–13*, 2013–14*, 2014–15*, 2015–16
 KNVB Women's Cup: 2007–08, 2014–15; runner-up 2012–13
 BeNe Super Cup: runner-up 2011

*During the BeNe League period (2012 to 2015), the highest placed Dutch team is considered as national champion by the Royal Dutch Football Association.Montpellier Coupe de France Féminine: runner-up 2015–16

InternationalNetherlands'''
 UEFA European Women's Championship: 2017

References

External links
Profile at Onsoranje.nl (in Dutch)
Profile at vrouwenvoetbalnederland.nl (in Dutch)
 
 
 
 Profile at fussballtransfers.com 
 Profile at soccerdonna.de 
 Player stats  at footofeminin.fr

1986 births
Living people
Sportspeople from Almelo
Dutch women's footballers
Netherlands women's international footballers
Expatriate women's footballers in Germany
Expatriate women's footballers in France
Eredivisie (women) players
2015 FIFA Women's World Cup players
Women's association football forwards
FFC Heike Rheine players
FC Twente (women) players
Montpellier HSC (women) players
UEFA Women's Championship-winning players
Knights of the Order of Orange-Nassau
Division 1 Féminine players
2019 FIFA Women's World Cup players
LGBT association football players
Dutch LGBT sportspeople
Dutch twins
Twin sportspeople
Lesbian sportswomen
Dutch expatriate women's footballers
Dutch expatriate sportspeople in France
Dutch expatriate sportspeople in Germany
Footballers at the 2020 Summer Olympics
Olympic footballers of the Netherlands
21st-century Dutch LGBT people
Footballers from Overijssel
Dutch expatriate sportspeople in Portugal
Expatriate women's footballers in Portugal
S.C. Braga (women's football) players
UEFA Women's Euro 2017 players